Michael Creed (born January 8, 1981 in Twin Falls, Idaho) is a former American cyclist and U23 time trial national champion. He was the sports director of Team SmartStop in the 2014 and 2015 seasons before being appointed head coach of USA Paralympics' paracycling programme in November 2015. He became director of the new American UCI Continental U23 development team Aevolo for 2017.

Major results

2000
 Under–23 National Road Championships
2nd Time trial
2nd Road race
2001
 3rd Overall Ronde de l'Isard
1st Stage 5
 2nd Overall Tour of the Gila
2002
 3rd Overall Ronde de l'Isard
2003
  Under–23 National Time Trial Championships
 1st Stage 3 Sea Otter Classic
2004
 1st Overall Cascade Cycling Classic
1st Stage 2
2010
 2nd Mount Hood Cycling Classic
 10th Overall Tour du Maroc

References

1981 births
Living people
American male cyclists
American cycling coaches
21st-century American people